Usha Ghanshyam Upadhyay (born 7 June 1956) is a Gujarati writer from Gujarat, India.

Life
She was born on 7 June 1956 in Bhavnagar. She completed M. A. in Gujarati and later received Ph. D. She works as the Head of the Department of Gujarati in Gujarat Vidyapith, Ahmedabad. She is the vice president of the Gujarati Writers' Association.

Works
She has written plays, essays, poetry and stories. Jal Billori (1998), Arundhatino Taro (2006) and Shyam Pankhi Aav Aav (2013) are her poetry collections. Mastikhor Maniyo (2004) is her collection of one-act plays. She has written a children's story, Ek Hati Roopa (1999).

Ikshit (1990), Sahitya Sannidhi (1998), Alokparva (2005), Samprat Gujarati Sahitya (2008), Aksharne ajvale (2009), Gujarati Sanshodhan-Sampadan (2009) are works of criticism. She has edited Adhit 15-19 (1992-1996), Jhanavi Smriti - 2,3 (1996, 1997), Gujarati Chayan (1999, 2000), Sarjan Prakriya Ane Narichetna (2006), Gujarati Lekhikaoni Pratinidhi Vartao (2006), Gujarati Lekhikaona Pratinidhi Nimbandho (2006), Gujarati Lekhikaona Pratinidhi atmakathya (2006), Matrubhashanu Mahimagyan (2010), Urmikavi Nhanalal (research, 2012), Kabirna Amarsutro. Vadali Sarovar (1999) and Kavivar Rajendra Shah Aur Unaki Kavita (2003, Hindi) are her translation. Her miscellaneous works are Gujarati Sahityano Gyan Samvad - Nimbandho (2006, 2012), Shunyatama Purela Dariyano Tarkhat (2007) and Radhakrishna Vina Biju Bol Ma (2007).

Her poems are translated in Odia, Bengali, Kannada, Hindi, Sanskrit and English.

Awards 
She has been awarded Batubhai Umarwadiya Prize by Gujarati Sahitya Parishad, Bhagini Nivedita Prize and Sauhard Samman  Puraskar by Uttar Pradesh Hindi Sansthan, Lucknow.

See also
 List of Gujarati-language writers

References

External links
 

Gujarati-language writers
People from Bhavnagar
1956 births
Living people
20th-century Indian poets
Dramatists and playwrights from Gujarat
Indian editors
Indian literary critics
Indian women editors
21st-century Indian poets
21st-century Indian women writers
21st-century Indian writers
20th-century Indian women writers
Women writers from Gujarat
Poets from Gujarat
Indian women poets